Rie fu is J-pop singer Rie fu's self-titled debut album, released in 2005.  A portion of her bilingual (English and Japanese) song Life is Like a Boat was used as the closing theme for the first 13 episodes of the anime series Bleach.

Track listing 

 "笑って、恵みのもとへ" (Waratte, Megumi no Moto he; Laughing, To the Origin Of Grace)
 "Beautiful Words"
 "Somebody's World"
 "2cm"
 "I So Wanted"
 "Decay"
 "Prayers & Melodies"
 "雨の日が好きって思ってみたい" (Ame no Hi ga Sukitte Omotte Mitai; I Want To Think I Like Rainy Days)
 "Voice" (Album Version)
 "ツキノウエ(Jamming Version)" (Tsuki no Ue; Over the Moon)
 "Shine"
 "Life is Like a Boat"
 "~Interlude~"
 "decay" (English Version)

2005 albums
Rie fu albums